Northwest University of Political Science and Law (NWUPL) is a university in Xi'an, and one of the top law schools in China.  The university serves as the educational center of law in the northwest part of China and as one of the key bases of law institutions of higher learning in China.

History

The university, originally known as Northern Shaanxi School of Politics and Law when it was set up in 1937, which was later, along with China Women's University and Ze-dong Youth Cadres School merged into Yan'an University; relocated in Xi'an in 1949, was renamed Northwest People's Revolutionary University; in 1953, was reshuffled into Northwest Cadres School of Political and Law by Northwest Bureau of China; later on, was renamed as Northwest Branch of Central Politics and Law Cadres School; in September 1958, merged with the Law School of Northwest University into Xi'an Institute of Politics and Law, as one of the Four Colleges of Politics and Law in China and the only law school in Northwestern China; in 1963, was renamed Northwest Institute of Politics and Law, and regarded as one of the nine prestigious law schools in China (5 institutes and 4 schools); and in 2006, was officially named as Northwest University of Political Science and Law (西北政法大学, NWUPL).

Present
Located in the time-honored city of Xi'an, Northwest University of Political Science and Law is a multi-disciplinary institution of higher education characterized of law education together with a broad array of disciplines such as philosophy, economics, management, and literature. It is a base of great importance for training nationwide law talents, the centre of law studies in northwest China, and also a significant base for studies of humanities and social sciences in Shaanxi province. Rooted in Shaanxi, oriented to Northwest region, and serving the whole nation, NWUPL has cultivated and is cultivating a great number of talents to serve China's development in the fields of law, economics, philosophy, arts and engineering.

With students and quality as its orientation, NWUPL aims at cultivating capable and virtuous students to meet the needs in all related walks of life. It always tries to map out most productive discipline construction schemes, constantly perfect each training program, create training models and pursue most fruitful methodology and curriculums. NWUPL was one of the earliest universities in China to implement the credit system, major-plus-auxiliary system, and gradually set up a practical talent training model through combining compulsory and optional courses and integrating class instruction, laboratory work and research. Over the last ten years, the University with clear idea and aim of the new times, and through repeated tries for reforms and innovations, has ascertained the blueprint for law talents training. The project "Research and Practice on Cultivating High-quality and Application-type Law Undergraduates" was awarded the Second Prize in the Sixth National Excellent Teaching Achievements Contest in 2009, together with other 17 teaching achievements awarded Honorary Mentions at the provincial level. In recent years, over 200 state-and-province-featured courses, bilingual demonstration courses, experimental and practical courses, and experimental and field work training centers have been formed, among which experimental centers for law science and journalism have been respectively honored as State-level and Province-level Demonstration Centers. The university has set up national and provincial innovative experimental center for law talents training, namely the West China Experimental Center for Talents Handling International Law Affairs. Because of its efforts to achieve sustainable development of education, NWUPL has gained unanimous praise and compliments from specialists and officials in charge of education. For example, NWUPL was graded "Excellence" in the evaluation of undergraduate education by the Ministry of Education in 2001 and in 2007.

In 2010, NWUPL established Legal Union with four other famous universities that are famous for their law schools in China: China University of Political Science and Law, Southwest University of Political Science and Law, East China University of Political Science and Law and Zhongnan University of Economics and Law. In 2011, NWUPL was granted the membership of Outstanding Legal Talent Training Plan by the Ministry of Education, and NWUPL was the only university in China that was set as all three kinds of national legal talent training center for the Outstanding Legal Talent Training Plan by the Ministry of Education, which include practical and multi-disciplinary talent center, international legal talent center and legal talent center for rural areas of Western China.

The NWUPL stresses law education and meanwhile spares no efforts to promote other disciplines of humanities and social sciences, trying to make academic studies the engine to power university education. The university has three institutes—Institute of law, Institute of Marxism and Institute of Higher Education, 21 academic research centers and 11 key disciplines at both state-level and province-level. In recent five years, it has conducted 39 state-funded projects in social sciences and 100 province-funded and ministry-funded projects, among which 20 have been prized by the ministry and the province. The university is also in charge of many influential Chinese journals of which Law Science, listed in the CSSCI, is one of the most influential among the law core journals in China.

Campus and student life

NWUPL consists of two campuses, the Yanta Campus and the Chang'an Campus, with an area of 1347 mu. It has set up 6 experimental and practice centers concerning legal practice, evidence technology, modern communications and so on with 16 basic laboratories, 72 field work centers, and with appliances for teaching and learning worth of about ¥60 million (RMB). Both campuses have their own libraries, totaling 1.7 million collections including 3,000 kinds of works in Chinese and foreign languages and more than 20 digital platforms. With Internet network covering the whole campus, NWUPL enjoys a comprehensively education administration system, an excellent multimedia network teaching and research system, campus IC management system, and other application software system as well to meet the needs of the faculty and students. The students' dormitories are fully equipped with comfortable facilities and public service system.

Northwest University of Political and Law has over 60 student organizations supported by the university. These include Student Union, the Union of Clubs and Associations. Notable clubs and associations in NWUPL include Model United Nations Association, whose members had won many awards in international level model united nations conference on represent of the university; Legal Service Center, which was founded in 1984, has been served to promote students' legal skills and provide people who can not afford an attorney with free legal services. Northwest University of Political and Law is also famous for its outstanding mock court debating team; in 2012, the team took the second place in Lilv Mock Court Debating Contest, which was held by Tsingshua University and is one of the most important mock court debating contests in China.

Faculty

NWUPL comprises 15 faculties, 1 department, and 1 center:

 Faculty of Philosophy and Social Development
 Faculty of Criminal Law
 Faculty of Civil and Commercial Law
 Faculty of Economic Law
 Faculty of Administrative Law
 Faculty of International Law
 Faculty of Politics and Public Management
 Faculty of Public Security
 Faculty of Foreign Languages
 Faculty of Journalism and Communications
 Faculty of Marxist Education
 Faculty of Graduate Education
 Faculty of Judiciary Education
 Faculty of Continuing Education
 Department of Physical Education
 Center of Information and Network Service

NWUPL offers 24 undergraduate programs ranging from philosophy, science of law, science of public security, economics, management, to humanities, among which the philosophy is lauded as National Leading Specialty, science of law the Provincial Outstanding Specialty, Administrative Management and Journalism the Provincial Leading Specialties. NWUPL, marked by its 22 graduate programs, boasting National Grade-A Graduate Discipline of science of law, is one of the earliest institutions of higher education empowered to enroll JM graduate students in the field of law studies. Both postgraduate and undergraduate students enrolled are from 31 provinces, autonomous regions, municipalities, Hong Kong, Macao, Taiwan, as well as other countries, including 12,000 full-time undergraduate students and 3,000 graduate students. During recent three years, NWUPL is the first-choice University for promising high-quality graduates, with its first-choice enrollment reaching 98% and employment-rate for graduates reaching 85%.

NWUPL enjoys a faculty of 1300 excellent and dedicated personnel, including 800 full-time teaching staff among which 302 are professors or associate professors and among which 213 are doctors or doctorate candidates, 16 enjoy government allowances and 5 are awarded as Provincial Outstanding Teachers. It consistently attaches great importance to improving its faculty’s expertise by encouraging some young professors or scholars to work in some work places. It implements the "double tutor system" and invites some famous scholars or experts to be guest professors or part-time professors.

International communication

To encourage its students to study overseas and broaden their international views, NWUPL has established cooperative relations with over 40 distinguished overseas universities and institutes in the U.S, the U.K, Germany, France and Russia. It has launched "3+1" international dual-degree programs in co-operation with Fort Hays State University, University of North Alabama, and Colorado Technical University in the US, and Chonbuk National University, Gyeongsang National University and Hannam University in South Korea.

Through decades of education experience, NWUPL has shaped three outstanding traits —adhering to the glorious tradition of Yan'an University, aiming at cultivating high-quality law elites, and serving the social development and legal construction in Northwest China.

Northwest University of Politics and Law provide its students with following foreign programs:

Washington University in St. Louis， LLM(Master of Law) Program

Fort Hays State University, (United States), Dual bachelor's degree Program.

University of North Alabama (United States), Master of Criminal Justice Program.

Duquesne University (United States), LLM(Master of Law) Program

University of Glasgow (United Kingdom), MPP Program.

See also
List of universities in China

References

List of Chinese Higher Education Institutions — Ministry of Education
Shaanxi Institutions Admitting International Students
陕西高校网址导航陕西大学名单（2008）
陕西本科普通高校名单

External links

 
Shaanxi
Law schools in China
1937 establishments in China
Educational institutions established in 1937
Universities and colleges in Xi'an